Miguel Alejandro Quiroga Castillo (born 15 September 1991) is a Bolivian footballer who plays for Club Aurora in the Bolivian Primera División.

Club career

The Strongest
A graduate of The Strongest's youth academy, Quiroga made his senior debut for the club on 31 October 2010 in a 3–1 defeat to C.D. Jorge Wilstermann. In January 2015, he scored his first competitive goal for the club, scoring in a 5–0 victory over Universitario de Pando. After featuring sparingly for the first team, he was loaned out to Ciclón ahead of the 2015–16 season.

Nacional Potosí
In January 2018, Quiroga joined Nacional Potosí, initially agreeing on a one-year loan deal. This was eventually extended to a full transfer. He made his professional debut for the club on 27 January 2018 in a 2–1 victory over San José. During the 2020 season, he served as club captain.

Club Aurora
After four years with Nacional Potosí, Quiroga moved to Club Aurora. Expressing confidence in the team's chances, Quiroga stated that his objective was to win the league title in 2022. He made his debut in the club's opening match of the season, a 0–0 draw against Guabirá.

International career
In May 2018, Quiroga was called up to the Bolivia national football team for a friendly match against the United States. However, he would not appear during the match.

Career statistics

Club

References

External links

1991 births
Living people
The Strongest players
Club Atlético Ciclón players
Nacional Potosí players
Club Aurora players
Bolivian Primera División players
Bolivian footballers
Association football midfielders
Footballers from La Paz